Efraim Allsalu (20 February 1929 – 7 September 2006) was an Estonian painter.

He was born and died in Tartu.

References

1929 births
2006 deaths
Hugo Treffner Gymnasium alumni
People from Tartu
20th-century Estonian painters
20th-century Estonian male artists